Giovanny Urshela Salcedo (born October 11, 1991) is a Colombian professional baseball third baseman for the Los Angeles Angels of Major League Baseball (MLB). He has previously played in MLB for the Cleveland Indians, Toronto Blue Jays, New York Yankees and Minnesota Twins.

Urshela made his MLB debut with Cleveland in 2015. After playing sparingly for Cleveland in 2015 and 2017, he played briefly for Toronto in 2018, before being traded to the Yankees for cash considerations. Urshela emerged as a valuable hitter for the Yankees during the 2019 season and was traded to Minnesota before the 2022 season.

Career

Cleveland Indians
Urshela signed with the Cleveland Indians as an international free agent in July 2008. He made his professional debut in 2009, playing for the Dominican Summer League Indians and the Arizona League Indians.

Urshela started the 2014 season with Akron and was promoted to the Columbus Clippers of the Class AAA International League during the season. After the 2014 season, the Indians added Urshela to their 40-man roster. He was named the Indians' fourth best prospect by MLB.com in 2015.

Urshela began the 2015 season with Columbus. He was called up to the major leagues on June 8, 2015. He got his first major league hit, a single, and first major league home run in the same game against the Seattle Mariners on June 11, 2015. He spent the entire 2016 season playing with Columbus and in the offseason he played winter baseball in the Venezuelan Professional Baseball League for Águilas del Zulia alongside future Yankees teammate Mike Tauchman.

Urshela batted .224 in 67 major league games for Cleveland in 2017. He opened the 2018 season on the disabled list. After completing his rehab assignment in the minors, Urshela was designated for assignment on May 4. He had batted .225 in 453 plate appearances for Cleveland.

Toronto Blue Jays
On May 9, 2018, Cleveland traded Urshela to the Toronto Blue Jays for cash considerations or a player to be named later. Urshela batted .233 with one home run and three RBIs in 19 games for Toronto, before he was designated for assignment by the Blue Jays on June 26. He cleared waivers and was assigned outright to the Triple-A Buffalo Bisons on July 3. He batted .244 in 91 plate appearances for the Bisons.

New York Yankees
On August 4, 2018, the Blue Jays traded Urshela to the New York Yankees in exchange for cash considerations. The Yankees assigned him to the Scranton/Wilkes-Barre RailRiders. He worked with Phil Plantier, the RailRiders' hitting coach, to make changes to his batting stance. Urshela batted .307 in 107 plate appearances for Scranton/Wilkes-Barre.

The Yankees selected Urshela's contract on April 6, 2019, after Miguel Andújar, the Yankees' starting third baseman tore his right shoulder labrum. Urshela began the season hitting 25-for-71 (.352), and continued to play for the Yankees when Andújar returned briefly in May, though Andújar soon opted to have season-ending surgery.

Urshela opened the 2020 season as the Yankees' starting third baseman. He played in 43 of the team's 60 games, missing time with a groin injury in late August. He batted .298/.368/.490 with 6 home runs and 30 runs batted in, and led all qualifying third basemen with a .992 fielding percentage. On September 30, in Game 2 of the AL Wild Card Series, Urshela became the first Yankees third baseman to hit a postseason grand slam doing so against his former team, the Cleveland Indians. This also helped the Yankees sweep the Indians in the best-of-three Wild Card Series. The Yankees went on to lose in the Division Series to the Tampa Bay Rays in five games.

Minnesota Twins
On March 13, 2022, the Yankees traded Urshela and Gary Sánchez to the Minnesota Twins in exchange for Josh Donaldson, Isiah Kiner-Falefa and Ben Rortvedt. In 2022 he batted .285/.338/.429. He was picked off second base twice, tops in the majors.

In October 2022, it was announced that Urshela would spend the 2022 offseason playing with his hometown Tigres de Cartagena of the Colombian Professional Baseball League.

Los Angeles Angels
On November 18, 2022, Urshela was traded from the Twins to the Los Angeles Angels for minor league pitcher Alejandro Hidalgo.

International career
Before the 2013 season he played for the Colombian national baseball team in the qualifiers for the World Baseball Classic, but the team lost to Panama and failed to qualify for the tournament. He played for the Colombian national baseball team again after they qualified for the 2017 World Baseball Classic. In 14 plate appearances, he slashed .143/.143/.143 with two hits.

References

External links

1991 births
2017 World Baseball Classic players
2023 World Baseball Classic players
Águilas del Zulia players
Colombian expatriate baseball players in Venezuela
Akron Aeros players
Akron RubberDucks players
Arizona League Indians players
Buffalo Bisons (minor league) players
Carolina Mudcats players
Cleveland Indians players
Colombian expatriate baseball players in Canada
Colombian expatriate baseball players in the United States
Columbus Clippers players
Dominican Summer League Indians players
Colombian expatriate baseball players in the Dominican Republic
Lake County Captains players
Living people
Major League Baseball players from Colombia
Major League Baseball third basemen
Mahoning Valley Scrappers players
Minnesota Twins players
New York Yankees players
Sportspeople from Cartagena, Colombia
Scranton/Wilkes-Barre RailRiders players
Toronto Blue Jays players